Hamilton West railway station serves the Hamilton West area of Hamilton, South Lanarkshire, in Scotland, lying on the Argyle Line.

It is situated near the headquarters of South Lanarkshire Council; the Hamilton campus of the University of the West of Scotland; Hamilton Sheriff Court; and the Hamilton Racecourse. It is situated next to New Douglas Park, home to Hamilton Academical Football Club.

The station is operated by ScotRail Trains who also provide all passenger services.

History
The station was once part of the Caledonian Railway and later, the London, Midland and Scottish Railway. It was originally opened by the Caledonian in September 1849, as the terminus of their branch line from Newton and was originally known simply as Hamilton.

The Hamilton Circle line was electrified by British Rail in 1974, as part of the wider scheme to electrify the northern end of the West Coast Main Line.

Facilities

Both platforms can be accessed via the footbridge at the Clydesdale Street entrance with disabled access available on platform 2 using a ramp which can also be accessed from Clydesdale Street by continuing past the main station entrance and following the footpath on the left, beside the adjacent bus stop.

A ticket office is staffed between 06:20 and 20:04 Monday-Saturday  alongside a self-service ticket machine within the shelter beside the ticket office on platform 1. There are no ticketing facilities on platform 2 although both platforms have two ScotRail Smartcard validators  each.

Accessible toilets are available on platform 1, next to the ticket office, and can be unlocked on request by asking staff in the ticket office. Sheltered seating is provided on platform 1 in both the ticket office and the same shelter that houses the self-service ticket machine whilst open-air seating is available on platform 2.

The station has a dedicated 191-space car park with 2 disabled parking spaces. The station also has 16 bicycle storage locations in the form of lockers and stands.

Services

Off-peak Monday to Saturday:

2tph to  via Glasgow Central Low Level.
2tph to  via .

On Sundays the service pattern is:

2tph to  via Glasgow Central Low Level.
1tph to  via .

References

External links 

RAILSCOT - Hamilton Branch

Railway stations in South Lanarkshire
Former Caledonian Railway stations
Railway stations in Great Britain opened in 1849
SPT railway stations
Railway stations served by ScotRail
Buildings and structures in Hamilton, South Lanarkshire
1849 establishments in Scotland